The community of Indians in Cyprus includes Indian expatriates in Cyprus, as well as Cypriot citizens of Indian origin or descent. Even though Cyprus has a much smaller community of Indians compared to other western countries, the community boasts over 7250 Indians primarily in the field of ICT (Information, Communication, Technology) and shipping industry. A large number are employed in various offshore companies. The multi-national company Amdocs maintains an office in Limassol which currently employs over 250 Indian software programmers.

The community also includes many students who have come to Cyprus to pursue higher studies. The population has grown almost ten-fold since 1997, when there were barely 300-400 long term Indians present.

Notable people
 Kodendera Subayya Thimayya -  Chief of Army Staff (India)

See also 
 Cyprus–India relations 
 Indians in Greece
 Indians in Turkey
 Hinduism in Cyprus

References

External links
 Cyprus extends unequivocal support to India: The Tribune (India)

Cyprus
Cyprus
Ethnic groups in Cyprus